AUTS2, activator of transcription and developmental regulator is a protein that in humans is encoded by the AUTS2 gene.

Function

This gene has been implicated in neurodevelopment and as a candidate gene for numerous neurological disorders, including autism spectrum disorders, intellectual disability, and developmental delay. Mutations in this gene have also been associated with non-neurological disorders, such as acute lymphoblastic leukemia, aging of the skin, early-onset androgenetic alopecia, and certain cancers. Alternative splicing results in multiple transcript variants encoding different isoforms.

References

Further reading